Barnabas Shikaan Imenger (15 May 1975 – 22 March 2021) was a Nigerian football player and manager.

Career
Imenger played as a midfielder for Lobi Bank and the Nigeria national team, making 8 international appearances.

He later managed Lobi Stars.

References

1975 births
2021 deaths
Nigerian footballers
Association football midfielders
Nigeria international footballers
Lobi Stars F.C. players
1995 King Fahd Cup players
Nigerian football managers
Lobi Stars F.C. managers